Victims is an American 1982 TV movie, starring Kate Nelligan. The film was directed by Jerrold Freedman written by Conrad Bromberg and William Wood.

Plot summary
A serial rapist who gets released on a technicality because of a mishandling of the investigation is pursued by his victims, who stalk him and want revenge for him raping them.

Cast
 Ken Howard as Joe Buckley
 Kate Nelligan as Ruth Hession
 Madge Sinclair as Sgt. Ashcroft
 Jonelle Allen as Maydene Jariott
 Pamela Dunlap as Nina Blygelder
 Amy Madigan as Chloe Brill
 Rose Portillo as Pilar Galloway
 Sherry Hursey as Susan Arthur
 Karmin Murcelo as Nellie Ramirez
 Bert Remsen as Lt. McClain
 Michael C. Gwynne as Attorney Walters
 Howard Hesseman as Charles Galloway

References

External links

American television films
1982 television films
1982 films
ABC network original films
Films directed by Jerrold Freedman